is a Japanese politician of the Democratic Party, a member of the House of Representatives in the Diet (national legislature). A native of Isesaki, Gunma and graduate of Waseda University, he worked at the Ministry of Posts and Telecommunications from 1994 to 1998, during which time he studied at the University of London. He was elected to the city assembly of Isesaki in 1999, to the assembly of Gunma Prefecture in 2003 and to the House of Representatives for the first time in 2005. Ishizeki is affiliated to the revisionist lobby Nippon Kaigi.

References

External links
 Official website in Japanese.

1972 births
Living people
People from Gunma Prefecture
Waseda University alumni
Alumni of the University of London
Members of the House of Representatives (Japan)
Members of Nippon Kaigi
Democratic Party of Japan politicians
Japan Innovation Party politicians
Democratic Party (Japan, 2016) politicians
21st-century Japanese politicians